HMS Fox, pennant number A320, was a Bulldog-class hydrographic survey ship of the British Royal Navy.

References
Notes

Bibliography
 Baker, A. D. The Naval Institute Guide of Combat Fleets of the World 1998–1999. Annapolis, Maryland, USA: Naval Institute Press. .
 Moore, John. Jane's Fighting Ships 1985–86. London: Jane's Yearbooks, 1985. .

 

Bulldog-class survey vessels
Survey vessels of the Royal Navy
1967 ships

Ships built in Lowestoft